"You Need A Man" is a song by Shanice. It was the third and final single from Shanice's fourth studio album, Shanice. It was released on September 7, 1999

Track listing
CD single
Album Version (3:52)
Instrumental (3:52)

Music video
The music video was directed by Bille Woodruff and filmed August 3, 1999.

Weekly charts

References

Shanice songs
1999 singles
Songs written by Montell Jordan
1998 songs
LaFace Records singles
Songs written by Shanice